The 1985–86 Washington Huskies men's basketball team represented the University of Washington for the 1985–86 NCAA Division I men's basketball season. Led by first-year head coach Andy Russo, the Huskies were members of the Pacific-10 Conference and played their home games on campus at Hec Edmundson Pavilion in Seattle, Washington.

There was no conference tournament this season; it debuted the following year.

Washington went to the 64-team NCAA tournament for the third consecutive year. Seeded 
twelfth in the Midwest regional, they lost to Michigan State in the first round in Dayton, Ohio.

Following Marv Harshman's retirement in March 1985, Russo was hired a few weeks later; he was formerly the head coach at

Postseason results

|-
!colspan=6 style=| NCAA Tournament

References

External links
Sports Reference – Washington Huskies: 1985–86 basketball season

Washington Huskies men's basketball seasons
Washington Huskies
Washington Huskies
Washington
Washington